Charles de Larcy (Charles Jubert, Baron De Larcy) (20 August 1805 in Le Vigan, Gard – 6 October 1882 in Pierrelatte) was a French Legitimist politician. He served as Minister of Transport from 19 February 1871 –  7 December 1872 and 26 November 1873 – 22 May 1874.

References

1805 births
1882 deaths
People from Le Vigan, Gard
Politicians from Occitania (administrative region)
Legitimists
Transport ministers of France
Members of the 5th Chamber of Deputies of the July Monarchy
Members of the 6th Chamber of Deputies of the July Monarchy
Members of the 1848 Constituent Assembly
Members of the National Legislative Assembly of the French Second Republic
Members of the National Assembly (1871)
French life senators